Nealchornea is a genus of trees in the family Euphorbiaceae first described as a genus in 1913. It is native to South America.

Species
 Nealchornea stipitata B.Walln. - Amazonas State in Brazil
 Nealchornea yapurensis Huber - E Colombia, Peru, Ecuador,  Amazonas State

References

Stomatocalyceae
Euphorbiaceae genera
Flora of South America